is a Japanese manga series written and illustrated by Masaoki Shindo. It was originally a one-shot published in Shueisha's Jump Giga magazine in December 2020, before being serialized in Weekly Shōnen Jump starting in June 2022. Its chapters have been collected into a single tankōbon volume as of October 2022.

Publication
Written and illustrated by Masaoki Shindo, RuriDragon was initially a one-shot published in Shueisha's Jump Giga magazine on December 28, 2020. It began serialization in Weekly Shōnen Jump on June 13, 2022. On August 1, 2022, Weekly Shōnen Jump announced that the series will go on indefinite hiatus due to Shindo's health. The first tankōbon volume was released on October 4, 2022.

Viz Media and Shueisha's Manga Plus website are publishing the series digitally in English.

Volume list

Other media
A voice comic adaptation of the one-shot and the first three chapters was released, featuring Chiaki Omigawa as the voice of Ruri Aoki. In July 2022, a set of digital stickers based on the series was released in the instant messaging service Line.

Reception
As of October 2022, RuriDragon has 200,000 copies in circulation. The first volume sold 74,874 copies during its first week of release, ranking seventh on Oricon's weekly manga chart. The series ranked first in the "Nationwide Bookstore Employees' Recommended Comics of 2023" list.

The first chapter received positive reviews from Japanese readers, who found the art "cute" and said that the story's loose atmosphere is not typical of a Jump manga. Brian Salvatore of Multiversity Comics praised the art and tone for approaching the juxtaposition between Ruri and her surroundings in a way that balances comedy and absurdity, adding that the way the story unfolds "seems natural to ‘real’ life." Steven Blackburn of Screen Rant complimented the comedy, but added that the chapter relies too much on it, causing a lack of development between the characters' relationships. Chanmei of  listed the series as one of their recommended manga of 2022, calling it a "revolutionary work."

References

External links
  
 
 

Books about dragons
Fantasy anime and manga
School life in anime and manga
Shōnen manga
Shueisha manga
Viz Media manga